Hirendra Leela Patranavis School (formerly Better High School) is an English-medium co-ed school located at Prince Golam Md. Shah Road, Kolkata, West Bengal, India. The school is affiliated to the ICSE. The school named after Hirendra Nath Patranavis, who established the school in 1954 with his wife Leela Patranavis. The school was started in a rented house at 4A, Nandy Street, Kolkata–700 019 with a few teachers and about 15 students. In 1986, it was shifted to a building at 25/20 Prince Golam Md. Shah Road, Kolkata–700 095 owned by Late Leela Patranavis. Eventually, the Primary and Secondary Sections were shifted to a newly constructed building at 24/1, Prince Golam Md. Shah Road, Kolkata–700 033. The ISC Section (Classes XI and XII) commenced from the year 1999 in the new premises.
The school presently has strength of about more than 1600 students, 100 teachers and 67 supporting staff. There are classes from Nursery to XII, having three streams of study (Commerce, Humanities and Science) in the ISC Section.

References

External links 
 

Schools in Kolkata
Educational institutions established in 1954
1954 establishments in West Bengal